Coed School (Korean: 남녀공학) was a South Korean pop group formed by record company Core Contents Media in 2010. The co-ed group consisted of four female members: Soomi, Hyoyoung, Hyewon, and Chanmi; and six male members: Taewoon, Sungmin, Jungwoo, Kwanghaeng, Kangho, and Noori. The group was eventually divided into two sub-units: an all female-group called F-ve Dolls (2011) and an all-male group called SPEED (2012).

History

2010: Debut and Something That Is Cheerful and Fresh 
Just under three weeks since their debut, the group followed up "Too Late" with a second single, "Bbiribbom Bberibbom" (삐리뽐 빼리뽐). The music video for the song was recorded on October 11, 2010, and features T-ara member Ham Eun-jeong. The video, along with a second music video for ballad "Nae Simjangeul Ttwige Haneun Mar" (내 심장을 뛰게 하는 말 "I Love You A Thousand Times"), was released on October 18. The single itself was released on October 19, and they performed "Bbiribbom Bberibbom" for the first time the next day on M! Countdown. "Bbiribbom Bberibbom" peaked at number 61 on the Gaon Chart.

The group's debut mini album, Something That Is Cheerful and Fresh, was released on October 28, 2010. It features the three previously released songs and various remixes. Despite being limited to 20,000 copies, Core Contents Media announced that the album had received 50,000 pre-orders and announced increase production of albums therefore selling roughly 47,000 albums.

2011: F-ve Dolls debut, Charming Five Girls

The four female members of the band, with new member Seo Eunkyo, were announced by Core Contents Media to debut as a sub group called 5dolls. On February 7, 2011 5dolls released the music video for their debut single "Ipsul Jaguk" (입술자국 "Lip Stains"), which was produced by Brave Brothers. The music video was also directed by  Cha Eun-taek. The MV also featured Jay Park. On February 16 they released the MV for "Neo Mariya" (너 말이야 "Your Words") from their debut mini-album "Charming Five Dolls".

F-ve Dolls released their 2nd mini-album "Time To Play" on May 11, 2011 with the lead single "Like This Or That" (이러쿵 저러쿵) and its accompanying music video.

2012: SPEED debut, Hommage to Lovey-Dovey

In early 2012 the group's male sub-unit SPEED debuted with the digital single  Hommage To Lovey-Dovey.  The group debuted as 5 without Kangho who was replaced by Jongkook of "Superstar K3".  Hommage to Lovey-Dovey contains 2 songs, and was released as a tribute to T-ara's song Lovey-Dovey  .

2013-2014: Disbandment 

Around mid-2013, a representative of Core Contents Media stated in an interview that they have no plans for Co-Ed School to promote as a full group as both of its sub-units had grown and changed their line-ups to become independent ensembles. By late 2014, all of the group's members, including Seo Eunkyo, had left the agency, thus confirming the group's disbandment.

Members

Former 
 Soomi (수미) - former leader, vocalist, rapper (2010-2012)
 Taewoon (태운) - rapper, vocalist (2010-2013)
 Sungmin (성민) - rapper, vocalist  (2010-2013)
 Yoosung (유성) - leader , vocalist (2010-2013)
 Hyoyoung (효영) - vocalist (2010-2013)
 Hyewon (혜원) - vocalist (2010-2013)
 Kwanghaeng (광행) - rapper (2010-2012)
 Kangho (강호) - rapper, vocalist (2010-2012)
 Chanmi (찬미) - vocalist (2010-2012)
 Noori (누리) - rapper, vocalist (2010-2012)

Sub-units
 F-ve Dolls (Soomi, Hyoyoung, Chanmi and Hyewon; 2011-2015)
 SPEED (Taewoon, Sungmin, Yoosung, Kwanghaeng, Noori; 2012-2015)

Discography

Extended play

Singles

References 

South Korean co-ed groups
MBK Entertainment artists
K-pop music groups
Musical groups established in 2010
South Korean dance music groups
South Korean pop music groups
2010 establishments in South Korea